Rareș Mihai Murariu (born 5 April 1999) is a Romanian professional footballer who plays as a goalkeeper for Liga II side SSU Politehnica Timișoara.

Club career

CFR Cluj
He made his league debut on 25 May 2021 in Liga I match against FCSB.

Honours
CFR Cluj
Liga I: 2020–21
Supercupa României: 2020

References

External links
 
 

1999 births
Living people
People from Mangalia
Romanian footballers
Romania youth international footballers
Association football goalkeepers
Liga I players
Liga II players
CFR Cluj players
SSU Politehnica Timișoara players